Greek divination is the divination practiced by ancient Greek culture as it is known from ancient Greek literature, supplemented by epigraphic and pictorial evidence. Divination is a traditional set of methods of consulting divinity to obtain prophecies (theopropia) about specific circumstances defined beforehand. As it is a form of compelling divinity to reveal its will by the application of method, it is, and has been since classical times, considered a type of magic. Cicero condemns it as superstition. It depends on a presumed "sympathy" (Greek sumpatheia) between the mantic event and the real circumstance, which he denies as contrary to the laws of nature. If there were any sympathy, and the diviner could discover it, then "men may approach very near to the power of gods."

The Greek word for a diviner is mantis (pl. manteis), generally translated as "prophet" or "seer". A mantis is to be distinguished from a hiereus, "priest," or hiereia, "priestess," by the participation of the latter in the traditional religion of the city-state. Manteis, on the other hand, were "unlicensed religious specialists," who were "expert in the art of divination." The first known mantis in Greek literature is Calchas, the mantis of the first scenes of the Iliad. His mantosune, or "art of divination" (Cicero's mantike, which he translates into Latin as divinatio), endowed him with knowledge of past, present, and future, which he got from Apollo (Iliad A 68–72). He was the army's official mantis. Armies of classical times seldom undertook any major operation without one, usually several. Mantosune in the army was a risky business. Prophets who erred were at best dismissed. The penalty for being a fraud was usually more severe.

Types of mantis
One of the characteristics of Greek mantic culture is "a contrast between official and independent practitioners." On the official side were the internationally recognized oracles, who divined under the auspices of a specified divinity according to a specified method, had their own temple at a specified location, and were supported by their own priesthood; for example, the Oracle of Apollo at Delphi, the Oracle of Zeus at Dodona, and so on. Although these oracles were located in sovereign city-states, they were granted a political "hands-off" status and free access so that delegations from anywhere could visit them.

The English language has reduced mention of mantic pronouncements to one word, "oracle," based on Latin oraculum, which can also mean the mantic center. This double meaning is true in ancient Greek and Latin also. The Greeks and Romans did not have a standard word that would apply in all cases. Manteion and chresterion were common in Greek. A prophecy might be referenced by the name of the god: "Apollo said ..." or "Zeus said ...." or by the name of the location: "Delphi says ..." etc. Implication was common: hieron, "the sacred [pronouncement]," fatus meus, "my fate," etc.

The other type of mantis was the independent consultant mentioned above. The important generals and statesmen had their own prophets, to avoid such difficulties as Agamemnon experienced, when Calchas forced him to sacrifice his daughter and ransom his female prize in the opening of the Iliad. Privately hired manteis, such as Alexander used, never seemed to disagree with command decisions, or if a possibly negative prophecy was received, made sure that it was given the most favorable interpretation. By that time, based on what Cicero said, the leaders were probably skeptical of prophecy, but the beliefs of the superstitious soldiers were a factor to be considered.

Oracles

Oracles were known institutional centers committed to vatic practice, as opposed to individual practitioners for hire. The most generally known and commonly used ones were located at Delphi and Dodona These had the status of being national and even international centers, even though there was as yet no nation of Greece, but there were a great many more scattered over Hellenic territory. States did not hesitate to send delegations to different oracles over the same issue, so that they could compare answers. Oracles that prophesied most successfully became popular and flourished. The least successful oracles were abandoned.

Part of the oracular administration was thus a team of what today would be called political scientists, as well as other scholars, who could perform such feats as rendering an oracle into the language of the applicant. The team also relied on information gleaned from the many visitors. The larger oracles were to a large degree intelligence centers posing as prophets. The cost was covered unknowingly by states and persons eager to make generous contributions to the god. As no one also would steal from a god, the center's administration included banking and treasury functions as well. Thus, the wealth of an oracle was available for confiscation by kings and generals during a war or other national crisis.

Summary of ancient Greek oracles
The ancient Greek oracles are known through references to them in ancient Greek literature, supplemented in many cases by archaeological information. The references were collected in the 19th century by the editorial staff of the classical encyclopedist, William Smith. A tabular summary follows. It has been necessary to supplement some of Smith's scanty descriptions with information from his sources, especially Plutarch Lives, Moralia and De Defectu Oraculorum.

Oracular deities

Zeus

Zeus was the major god of the ancient Greek divine panoply. He commanded men and gods alike. Ideologically he was the guardian of justice (themis), the patron of the state, and the final arbiter of destiny. Etymologically he descends from the Proto-Indo-European sky god, root *dyeu-, "shine," applied to the daylight sky, who, judging from his appearance in different descendant cultures, such as the Indic and the Roman, had the same status. Thunderstorms were the mark of his immediate presence, and lightning bolts, made of sacred fire, were his weapons.

The literary fragments suggest that Aristotle's view was generally believed, that the first Hellenes were of the tribe of the Selloi, or Helloi, in Epirus and that they called the country Hellopia. If these fragments are to be believed, Epirus must have been an early settlement location of Indo-Europeans who were to become Greek speakers by evolution of the culture, especially language. They took over a center of worship of the former culture, called by them "Pelasgians," introducing Zeus, and from then on had responsibility for the shrine and oracle of "Pelasgian Zeus," becoming "Dodonaian Zeus."

As to when these settlement events may have occurred, the decipherment of Linear B, writing of about 5000 baked clay tablets found at known Greek prehistoric centers, opened a whole new chapter in Greek history, termed by most "the Greek Bronze Age." Zeus is represented in those tablets in both masculine and feminine form. The masculine does not have a nominative case, but does have a genitive, Diwos, and a dative, Diwei. The feminine, Diwia, is distinct from Hera, who appears on her own. These deities are mentioned in tablets recording offerings to them.

Zeus was known as Zeus Moiragetes, which is to refer to the power of Zeus to know the fate of mortals. The newly born Zeus himself learnt his fate by the night and, accordingly, by Phanes, while within a dark cave.

Herodotus stated the earliest oracle was the oracle of Zeus located at Dodona, although archaeological remains at Delphi date to earlier. There was an oracle at Dodona from the 5th century BCE, although the oracle of Zeus might have still have had a practice at the same locus earlier, prior to construction of the temple, a possibility which seems probable since the temple remains show an oak tree at the location.

Apollo
Apollo, the most important oracular deity, is most closely associated with the supreme knowledge of future events which is the possession of Zeus. Apollo was known as Apollo Moiragetes, referring to Apollo as the god of fate. The oracle at Delphi gave oracles from Apollo.

Apollo in an oracular function is associated with both plague, purification and truth. Even though the prophecies given by him were ambiguous, he is said to have never uttered a lie.

Apollo's oracle at Delphi is the most famous and was the most important oracular site of ancient Greece.

According to Homer and Callimachus, Apollo was born with prophetic abilities and the power of reading the will of Zeus. However, a less popular belief is that he was instructed by Pan in divination as found within myth.

Apollo and Hermes
Apollo transfers to Hermes a skill in cleromancy, upon the request of Hermes. Speaking within the hymn, Apollo expounds on the difficulty he experiences with his own divination, and then proceeds to provide the gift of divination to his brother Hermes, though a lesser skill, because the mantic dice are not under the control and influence of the will of Zeus. Hermes' skill at divination, though inferior to the skill of Apollo, is still of a divine nature.

The gift of Apollo is bee maidens with oracular abilities.

Hermes
Hermes is associated with divination by lottery, otherwise known as cleromancy.

The triad of bee maidens are prophetic via Hermes.

Pan and the nymphs
In Arcadia Pan was the principal oracular deity, instead of Apollo. Prophecy is associated with caves and grottoes within Greek divination, and the Nymphs and Pan were associated variously with caves. Panolepsy is a cause of inspirational states of mind, including abilities of a mantic nature.

Prometheus
The god Prometheus gave the gift of divination to humanity.

Aeschylus wrote Prometheus Bound during the 5th century BCE in which Prometheus founded all the art of civilization including divination. This he did by stealing fire from the gods and gifting this fire to humankind. The 5th century BCE telling is a re-telling of a story told by Hesiod within the 8th century BCE

Independent consultants
Greek history and literature also relate stories of independent manteis consulted on specific occasions.

Calchas

Calchas was the first known mantis of Greek literature, appearing at the beginning of Book I of the Iliad. He was employed by the Greek army. His divination required the sacrifice of the commander's daughter to obtain the winds to bring the Greek fleet to Troy.

Tiresias

Of all oracles of ancient Hellenic culture and society, a man named Tiresias was thought as the most vital and important.

Methodologies
Greek practice made use of various techniques for divination.

Classification
Belief in divination was widespread in ancient Greece. In De Divinatione, Cicero argues with his brother, Quintus, against divination, which Quintus has espoused. The latter argues that if the gods exist, they must communicate with man, and if divination is proved to be true, then the gods must exist. He offers Marcus a classification of divinations, which he says is ancient: “There are two classes of divination, one of which is of art, the other, of nature.” Cicero's reply is that there may or may not be gods, but even if there are, there is no logical necessity that they communicate through divination.

In essence, the artificial divination is staged. The divinator uses reason and conjecture to set up an experiment, so to speak, testing the god's will, such as determining to look at certain quarters of the sky at certain times for the presence of certain kinds of birds. Cicero's reply is that the set-up is already a predisposition. Events that happen according to natural law are given surcharges of prejudicial meaning, when the outcomes are really attributable to chance. In the natural type, such as dreams, spontaneous occurrences are given subjective interpretations based on expectations.

These same types appear in modern sources under different names; for example, E.A. Gardner in the Oxford Companion to Greek Studies refers to “direct” or “spontaneous” and “indirect” or “artificial” divination, which turn out to be Quintus Cicero's “of nature” and “of art” respectively. In direct divination, a divinator might experience dreams, temporary madness, or phrensy (frenzy); all these states of mind being considered  inspiration of truth. The divinator typically must take steps to produce such a state. Attested techniques include, sleeping in conditions whereby dreams might be more likely to occur, inhaling mephitic vapour, chewing bay leaf, and drinking of blood. In indirect divination the divinator does not experience any inspiration himself but observes natural conditions and phenomena.

Under the influence of this scientific view, recounted by Marcus Cicero, that the phenomenal world is driven by natural law, whether or not there is any divinity, the pre-Christian emperors suppressed artificial, or indirect, divination, attacking its social centers, the oracles, as political rivals. Christianity at first was treated as a superstitious cult. The need for the population to feel that they were in direct communication with divinity, however, was overwhelming. The state, unable to make any headway against it, gave in to it finally when Constantine became the first Christian emperor. Constantine had a direct divinatory experience himself on the night before the Battle of the Milvian Bridge, in which he dreamed he saw a cross and the words “in this sign you shall conquer.” Going forward under the sign of the cross he won, and converted to Christianity.

From then on believers had a new word for the results of divination, the sign. The old, indirect divination was gone, classified as an abomination by the Christians. Christian writers, such as St. Augustine, began to write extensively of signs from God and the uses of signs by humans to mean religious matters or outcomes. Under this guise Quintus’ classification appeared again as “evoked” for “of art” and “spontaneous” for “of nature.” The contest between the scientific view, which rejects all divination as superstition, and the religious view, which promulgates signs, continues in the present times, along with generally discredited remnants of indirect divination, such as reading the tea leaves, or Chinese fortune cookies.

Typology
The following table lists types of divination known to have been practiced by the ancient Greeks.

Augury

Augury, or divination by omens, is a practice which still survives to the modern era (circa 2013).

Cleromancy

This is divination by throwing of lots, stones, or dice.

Astragalomancy is a type of cleromancy performed by throwing the knuckle-bones of sheep or other ruminants (astragaloi) to be able to tell the future. As each face of the astragalos is assigned a numerical value, astragaloi can be rolled like dice and the resultant roll matched to a table of possible outcomes. A number of these tables were engraved on public monuments in southern Anatolia.

Hydromancy

Hydromancy, or divination by water, is a Hellenic practice which still survives in the modern era (circa 2013).

Necromancy

Necromancy is a divinatory practice of consulting the dead.

Pyromancy

Pyromancy, divination by fire is a practice that has survived to the modern era (circa 2013).

Stikhomanteia
Divination of this type utilizes writings, either by scraps of paper with writing upon them chosen from within a vessel, or by opening a book at random. The first of these two type was practiced by the Sibylline oracles.

Thriai
This is divination by using pebbles. The Thriai were personification of this type of divination.

Ancient sources

Democritus advocated divination. Herodotus provided a record of the prophetic productions resulting from Delphi as well as several instances of augury. Dicaearchus dismissed any notion of the trueness of divination by any means other than dreams and frenzy. Aristophanes mentions an oracle in his comedy Knights. Aristotle wrote On Divination in Sleep, written 350 BCE. Posidonius attempted to elaborate a theory of divination; he envisioned the sight of the future, as a cable might unwind, so insight into the future unfolds within the mind. Chrysippus claimed empirical evidence for the truthfulness of divination. Plutarch advocated the divination at the Oracle of Delphi; he considered enthusiastic prophecy to be possible when the soul of the Pythia becomes incorporated with Apollo in an inner vortex internal to the Pythia. Cicero wrote a book On Divination. Xenophon recorded his own meeting with a diviner named Eucleides, in chapter 7 of his work Anabasis.

Pythagoras was said to have practiced divination. Socrates both practiced and advocated divination. Xenophon was thought to be skilled at foretelling from sacrifices, and attributed much of his knowledge to Socrates in "The Cavalry Commander".

See also
African divination
Mesopotamian divination

References

Reference bibliography

External links

Ancient Greek culture
Divination